The genus Ophrys is a large group of orchids from the alliance Orchis in the subtribe Orchidinae. They are widespread across much of Europe, North Africa, Caucasus, the Canary Islands, and the Middle East as far east as Turkmenistan.

These plants are remarkable in that they successfully reproduce through pseudocopulation, that is, their flowers mimic female insects to such a degree that amorous males are fooled into mating with the flowers, thereby pollinating them.  There are many natural hybrids.

They are referred to as the "bee orchids" due to the flowers of some species resemblance to the furry bodies of bees and other insects. Their scientific name Ophrys is the Greek word for "eyebrow", referring to the furry edges of the lips of several species.

Ophrys was first mentioned in the book "Natural History" by Pliny the Elder (23-79 AD).

Biology 

They are terrestrial or ground orchids from central to South Europe, North Africa, Asia Minor, up to the Caucasus Mountains, but mostly in the Mediterranean region. They have been said to be the most important group of European terrestrial orchids.

During summer, all Ophrys orchids are dormant as underground bulbous tubers, which serve as a food reserve. In late summer/autumn they develop a rosette of leaves. Also a new tuber starts to grow and matures until the following spring; the old tuber slowly dies. The next spring the flowering stem starts to grow. During flowering the leaves have already started to wither.

Most Ophrys orchids are dependent on symbiotic fungi. Transplanting specimens, especially wild specimens, is difficult, sometimes impossible, due to this symbiosis unless a large amount of surrounding earth is also taken with the plant.  All orchids are protected under CITES II and should not be removed or disturbed in habitat.

The shiny, basal leaves have a green or bluish color. Two to twelve flowers grow on an erect stem with basal leaves. These species are successfully cultivated by specialist growers of terrestrial orchids and are reported to be difficult to grow, being sensitive to rotting and damping off diseases if not properly subjected to a cool and dry aestivation period over the summer months with no water.

Pollination 
Orchids of the genus Ophrys use sexual deception to attract pollinators to their flowers. In sexual deception, an orchid attracts male pollinators by producing the sex pheromone of virgin female pollinators in addition to providing visual and tactile cues (Schiestl 2005; Schluter et al. 2009; Stokl et al. 2009). These signals stimulate mating behavior in the male pollinators, which then attempt copulation, called “pseudocopulation”, with the orchid labellum (Schluter et al. 2009). During pseudocopulation, pollen from the flower's column becomes attached to some part of the pollinator, usually the head or abdomen, and the pollinator inadvertently carries and transfers this pollen to other flowers when they are once again enticed into pseudocopulation. While the morphological cues such as the shape and texture of the labellum play a role especially at close range in inducing the pollinator mating behavior, the orchid's pheromone mimic, or allomone, has been shown to play the most important role in enticing pollinators to the flower (Schiestl 2005; Schluter et al. 2009).

The allomone produced by an orchid is specific to its pollinator, of which it usually only has one (Ayasse et al. 2007; Gogler et al. 2009, Schluter et al. 2009).  The allomone is a mixture of alkenes and alkanes (Schiestl and Cozzolino 2008). There are one or more active species in this mixture that account for the attraction of pollinators (Vereeken and Schiestl 2008). Pollinators and orchids use the same chemical compounds in the same absolute amounts in their pheromones and allomones, respectively (Schiestl 2008).

Every Ophrys orchid has its own pollinator insect and is completely dependent on this species for its survival. Duped males are less likely to return and may ignore other plants of the same species. Only about 10% of an Ophrys population gets pollinated. This is enough to preserve the population, since each Ophrys orchid produces about 12,000 minute seeds.

Species 

Almost 2,000 names have been proposed for species, subspecies, and "nothospecies" (i.e. species of hybrid origin) within the genus. The number of species recognized varies very widely between authorities. Flora Europaea in 1980 and Pedersen & Faurholdt in 2007 listed about 20 species in Europe as a whole; Buttler in 1991 increased this to 53 for slightly larger geographical area; Delforge in 1995 gave a total of 130 species. By contrast, a molecular phylogenetic study in 2008 suggested that there were around 10 distinguishable groups.

The need for further study is indicated. For the moment (May 2014), we follow the lead of Kew Botanical Garden's, the World Checklist of Selected Plant Families in provisionally recognizing the following taxa:

Ophrys apifera Huds. – Bee orchid - Central and southern Europe, North Africa, east to Iran
Ophrys × arachnitiformis Gren. & Philippe - False spider orchid (hybrid O. fuciflora × O. sphegodes) - western and central Europe from France and Britain to Sicily and Hungary
Ophrys argolica H.Fleischm. – Argolian bee-orchid
Ophrys argolica subsp. aegaea (Kalteisen & H. R. Reinhard) H. A. Pedersen & Faurh. - Greek islands 
Ophrys argolica subsp. argolica - Greece
Ophrys argolica subsp. biscutella (O. Danesch & E. Danesch) Kreutz - southern Italy, Croatia
Ophrys argolica subsp. crabronifera (Sebast. & Mauri) Faurh. - central and southern Italy
Ophrys argolica subsp. elegans (Renz) E. Nelson - Cyprus
Ophrys argolica subsp. lesbis (Gölz & H. R. Reinhard) H. A. Pedersen & Faurh. - western Turkey and the Greek Islands
Ophrys argolica subsp. lucis (Kalteisen & H. R. Reinhard) H. A. Pedersen & Faurh. - Turkey, Syria, Greek islands
Ophrys atlantica Munby – Atlantic Bee-orchid - Spain, Morocco, Algeria, Tunisia
Ophrys bertolonii Moretti – Bertoloni's bee-orchid - from Spain to Serbia

Ophrys bombyliflora Link – Bumblebee orchid - Mediterranean Basin and Canary Islands
Ophrys cilicica Schltr. – Cilician bee-orchid - Turkey, Syria, Iran (note that Cilicia means southern Turkey)
Ophrys ferrum-equinum Desf. – Horseshoe bee-orchid  - Albania, Greece, Turkey
Ophrys ferrum-equinum subsp. ferrum-equinum - Albania, Greece, Turkey
Ophrys ferrum-equinum subsp. gottfriediana (Renz) E.Nelson - Greece
Ophrys fuciflora (F.W.Schmidt) Moench – Late spider-orchid - from Britain to Iraq
Ophrys fuciflora subsp. andria (P.Delforge) Faurh. - Greek islands
Ophrys fuciflora subsp. apulica O.Danesch & E.Danesch - southern Italy including Sicily
Ophrys fuciflora subsp. biancae (Tod.) Faurh. - Sicily
Ophrys fuciflora subsp. bornmuelleri (M.Schulze) B.Willing & E.Willing - Turkey, Cyprus, Greek islands, Syria, Palestine, Israel, Iraq 
Ophrys fuciflora subsp. candica E.Nelson ex Soó  - southern Italy including Sicily, plus Greece and Turkey
Ophrys fuciflora subsp. chestermanii (J. J. Wood) H. Blatt & W. Wirth - Sardinia
Ophrys fuciflora subsp. elatior (Paulus) R. Engel & Quentin Germany, Switzerland, France, Italy, Slovenia, Croatia 
Ophrys fuciflora subsp. fuciflora - from Britain to Syria
Ophrys fuciflora subsp. grandiflora (H. Fleischm. & Soó) Faurh. - Turkey, Cyprus
Ophrys fuciflora subsp. lacaitae (Lojac.) Soó - Italy, Malta, Croatia
Ophrys fuciflora subsp. oblita (Kreutz, Gügel & W. Hahn) Faurh., H. A. Pedersen & S. G. Christ - Greece, Turkey, Lebanon, Syria, Palestine, Israel 
Ophrys fuciflora subsp. oxyrrhynchos (Tod.) Soó - southern Italy including Sicily
Ophrys fuciflora subsp. pallidiconi Faurh. - Turkey
Ophrys fuciflora subsp. parvimaculata O. Danesch & E. Danesch - Italy
Ophrys fuciflora var. ziyaretiana (Kreutz & Ruedi Peter) Faurh. & H. A. Pedersen - Turkey, Lebanon, Syria, Palestine, Israel

Ophrys fusca Link – Sombre bee-orchid, dark bee-orchid - from Portugal to Turkey
Ophrys fusca subsp. blitopertha (Paulus & Gack) Faurh. & H.A.Pedersen - Turkey, Greek islands
Ophrys fusca subsp. cinereophila (Paulus & Gack) Faurh.- Greece, Turkey, Cyprus, Lebanon, Syria 
Ophrys fusca subsp. fusca  - from Portugal to Turkey
Ophrys fusca subsp. iricolor (Desf.) K.Richt.  - from Portugal to Turkey
Ophrys fusca subsp. pallida (Raf.) E. G. Camus in E. G. Camus & A. A. Camus - Sicily, Tunisia, Algeria
Ophrys insectifera L. – Fly orchid - much of Europe from Spain to Russia and Finland
Ophrys insectifera nothosubsp. tytecaeana P. Delforge - France
Ophrys insectifera subsp. aymoninii Breistr. France, Spain
Ophrys insectifera subsp. insectifera - much of Europe from Spain to Russia and Finland
Ophrys isaura Renz & Taubenheim - Turkey
Ophrys kojurensis Gölz - Iran
Ophrys konyana Kreutz & Ruedi Peter - Turkey
Ophrys kopetdagensis K.P. Popov & Neshat. - Turkmenistan
Ophrys kotschyi H. Fleischm. & Soó – Cyprus bee-orchid, Kotschy's bee-orchid - Greece, Cyprus
Ophrys kotschyi subsp. ariadnae (Paulus) Faurh. - Greek islands and mainland
Ophrys kotschyi subsp. cretica (Soó) H.Sund. - Crete and other Greek islands
Ophrys kotschyi subsp. kotschyi – Cyprus 
Ophrys kreutzii W.Hahn - Turkey
Ophrys lepida S. Moingeon & J.-M. Moingeon - Sardinia
Ophrys lunulata Parl. - Sicily

Ophrys lutea Cav. – Yellow bee-orchid - from Portugal and Morocco to Syria
Ophrys lutea subsp. aspea (Devillers-Tersch. & Devillers) Faurh. - Tunisia, Libya
Ophrys lutea subsp. galilaea (H. Fleischm. & Bornm.) Soó - from Portugal and Morocco to Syria
Ophrys lutea subsp. lutea - from Portugal and Morocco to Turkey
Ophrys lutea subsp. melena Renz - Greece, Albania
Ophrys lycia Renz & Taubenheim - Turkey
Ophrys omegaifera H. Fleischm. – Omega bee-orchid - from Portugal and Morocco to Syria
Ophrys omegaifera var. basilissa (C. Alibertis, A. Alibertis & H.R. Reinhard) Faurh - Greece
Ophrys omegaifera subsp. dyris (Maire) Del Prete - Spain, Portugal, Morocco, Balearic Islands
Ophrys omegaifera subsp. fleischmannii (Hayek) Del Prete - Crete and other Greek islands
Ophrys omegaifera subsp. hayekii (H. Fleischm. & Soó) Kreutz  - Sicily, Algeria, Tunisia
Ophrys omegaifera subsp. israelitica (H. Baumann & Künkele) G. Morschek & K. Morschek - Israel, Palestine, Lebanon, Syria, Turkey, Cyprus, Greece 
Ophrys omegaifera subsp. omegaifera - Turkey, Greek islands
Ophrys omegaifera subsp. apollonae or Ophrys apollonae - Greek islands, Turkey
Ophrys pseudomammosa Renz -  Turkey, Greece

Ophrys reinholdii Spruner ex Fleischm. – Reinhold's bee-orchid - from Croatia to Turkey
Ophrys reinholdii subsp. antiochiana (H. Baumann & Künkele) H.Baumann & R.Lorenz - Turkey, Syria
Ophrys reinholdii subsp. reinholdii - from Croatia to Turkey
Ophrys reinholdii subsp. straussii (H. Fleischm.) E. Nelson - Iran, Iraq, Turkey, Cyprus, Greek islands
Ophrys schulzei Bornm. & Fleischm. - Iran, Iraq, Turkey, Syria, Lebanon
Ophrys scolopax Cav. – Woodcock bee-orchid - from Morocco and Portugal to Hungary and Iran
Ophrys scolopax subsp. apiformis (Desf.) Maire & Weiller - Spain, Portugal, Sardinia, Sicily, Tunisia, Algeria, Morocco
Ophrys scolopax subsp. conradiae (Melki & Deschâtres) H.Baumann & al. - Corsica, Sardinia, Italy
Ophrys scolopax subsp. cornuta (Steven) E.G. Camus - Italy, Hungary, the Balkans, Crimea, Turkey, Caucasus
Ophrys scolopax subsp. heldreichii (Schltr.) E.Nelson Greece, Turkey
Ophrys scolopax var. minutula (Gölz & H.R. Reinhard) H.A. Pedersen & Faurh - Turkey, Greek islands
Ophrys scolopax subsp. rhodia (H.Baumann & Künkele) H.A. Pedersen & Faurh. - Greek islands
Ophrys scolopax subsp. scolopax  - from Portugal to Iran

Ophrys speculum Link – Mirror bee-orchid, mirror orchid - from Portugal to Syria
Ophrys speculum subsp. lusitanica O.Danesch & E.Danesch - Spain, Portugal
Ophrys speculum subsp. regis-ferdinandii (Acht. & Kellerer ex Renz) Soó - Turkey, Greek islands
Ophrys speculum subsp. speculum - from Portugal to Syria
Ophrys sphegodes Mill. –  Early spider-orchid - from Britain and Portugal to Iran
Ophrys sphegodes nothosubsp. jeanpertii (E.G. Camus) Del Prete & Conte - France, Spain, Balkans (O. sphegodes subsp. araneola × O. sphegodes subsp. sphegodes)
Ophrys sphegodes subsp. aesculapii (Renz) Soó ex J.J.Wood - Greece
Ophrys sphegodes subsp. araneola (Rchb.) M.Laínz - Germany, Switzerland, France, Spain, Italy, Yugoslavia 
Ophrys sphegodes subsp. atrata (Rchb.f.) A.Bolòs - from Portugal to Serbia
Ophrys sphegodes subsp. aveyronensis J.J.Wood - France, Spain
Ophrys sphegodes subsp. catalcana Kreutz - European Turkey
Ophrys sphegodes subsp. cretensis H.Baumann & Künkele - Crete and other Greek islands
Ophrys sphegodes subsp. epirotica (Renz) Gölz & H.R.Reinhard - Albania, Greece
Ophrys sphegodes subsp. gortynia H.Baumann & Künkele - Crete and other Greek islands
Ophrys sphegodes subsp. helenae (Renz) Soó & D.M.Moore - Albania, Greece
Ophrys sphegodes subsp. mammosa (Desf.) Soó ex E.Nelson - from the Balkans to Turkmenistan
Ophrys sphegodes subsp. passionis (Sennen) Sanz & Nuet - France, Spain, Sardinia, Sicily, mainland Italy 
Ophrys sphegodes subsp. sipontensis (R.Lorenz & Gembardt) H.A.Pedersen & Faurh. - Apulia
Ophrys sphegodes subsp. sphegodes - from Britain and Spain to Hungary and the Balkans
Ophrys sphegodes subsp. spruneri (Nyman) E.Nelson - Crete and other Greek islands

Ophrys tenthredinifera Willd. - from Portugal and Morocco to Turkey
Ophrys tremoris Gämperle & Gölz - Turkey
Ophrys ulupinara W.Hahn - Turkey
Ophrys umbilicata Desf. - from the Balkans to Iran
Ophrys umbilicata subsp. beerii Shifman - Israel
Ophrys umbilicata subsp. bucephala (Gölz & H.R.Reinhard) Biel - Turkey and the Greek islands
Ophrys umbilicata subsp. calycadniensis Perschke - Turkey
Ophrys umbilicata subsp. flavomarginata (Renz) Faurh. - Cyprus, Syria, Israel
Ophrys umbilicata subsp. lapethica (Gölz & H.R.Reinhard) Faurh. - Cyprus
Ophrys umbilicata subsp. latakiana (M.Schönfelder & H.Schönfelder) Faurh. & H.A.Pedersen - Turkey, Syria
Ophrys umbilicata subsp. umbilicata  - from the Balkans to Iran
Ophrys urteae Paulus - Turkey
Ophrys zagrica Gölz - Iran

In popular culture

Sexually deceptive orchids in the genus Ophrys feature in the 2002 movie, 'Adaptation', written by Charlie Kaufman. The film follows a screenwriter attempting to adapt the novel 'The Orchid Thief' into a movie screenplay. The species appearing in the movie may be Ophrys speculum.

The naturalist David Attenborough discusses the unusual pollination systems among Ophrys orchids in his 1995 BBC television series 'The Private Life of Plants', as well as the book accompanying the series.

References

External links 
 
 Extensive information and beautiful slides
 Ophrys picture database 
 Orchids of Greece , slide show.

 
Orchideae genera
Orchids of Europe
Flora of North Africa
Flora of Turkmenistan
Flora of Iran
Flora of the Canary Islands